Mikhail Pavlovich Balenkov (Russian name: Михаил Баленков; 6 March 1940 – 1995) was a Soviet rower. He competed at the 1960 Summer Olympics in Rome with the men's eight where they were eliminated in the heats.

References

1940 births
1995 deaths
Soviet male rowers
Olympic rowers of the Soviet Union
Rowers at the 1960 Summer Olympics
Rowers from Saint Petersburg